McCluer North High School (founded 1971) is a public school in Florissant, Missouri, United States in the St. Louis metropolitan area. The McCluer North campus is centrally located in the Ferguson-Florissant School District. Located in a residential area, the campus is bounded by Waterford Drive, St. Catherine and Parker Road. Facing the site is the Florissant Civic Center and its  park-like setting.

Immediately adjacent are the former District Administrative Offices that included services for students and families in the Community School Program, PROBE Gifted Program, comprehensive Early Education services and the Child Development Center, a professionally run day care center that operates in conjunction with McCluer North's Child Development classes. On the Parker Road side of the campus, McCluer North backs up to Parker Road Elementary School.

McCluer North was designed to provide adaptable and flexible space for a variety of instructional activities that include large-group presentations, small-group work and independent study. The multi-level building features a Student Concourse and commons area that has a cafeteria and an outdoor plaza where staff and students can socialize.

A focal point in the school is the Instructional Materials Center (IMC), which serves as a library center where students can conduct research, independent study, guided or independent reading. The Counseling Center, located in the IMC, provides a full range of services for students.

During her 2008 bid for the presidency, Senator Hillary Clinton made a campaign stop at McCluer North. Bill and Chelsea Clinton also attended the campaign rally, which was held in the school's gymnasium.

Notable alumni
 Barrett Brooks, former NFL player and current radio personality
 Chingy, rapper and entertainer
 Bob Christian, former NFL player (Atlanta Falcons)
 Sally Hampton, writer, producer
 Kathleen Madigan, comedian
 Jon Vaughn, former NFL player (New England Patriots)
 Pete Weber, hall of fame professional bowler (dropped out to join Pro Bowlers Tour)
 Shandi Finnessey, Miss USA 2004 and Miss Universe 2004 First Runner-Up
 Mike O'Mara, former St. Louis County Councilman

References

External links
 McCluer North High School
  - Archives of older webpages
 Picture of Hillary Clinton at McCluer North
 School profile, stlamerican.com

Educational institutions established in 1971
High schools in St. Louis County, Missouri
Public high schools in Missouri